Olivier Kamanda is the Director of Learning and Impact Strategy at the John S. and James L. Knight Foundation. He is a former Presidential Innovation Fellow and previously served as speechwriter and senior advisor to Secretary of State Hillary Clinton.

Education
He obtained a bachelor of science degree from Princeton University in 2003 and his Juris Doctor from the University of Pennsylvania Law School in 2009. It was during his third year at Penn Law that he founded the Foreign Policy Digest. Also while in law school, he was executive editor of the school's Journal of International Law and a columnist for The Huffington Post.

Career
He is the founding editor-in-chief of Foreign Policy Digest. Kamanda is a former Trustee of Princeton University and a fellow with the Truman National Security Project.

Kamanda was president of the Montgomery County Young Democrats from 2004 to 2006.

Since 2010, he has been an associate lawyer at White & Case in Washington, D.C. In 2011, Kamanda was named one of Washington, D.C.'s "Most Influential Leaders Under 40" by Washington Life Magazine.

References

External links

 Olivier Kamanda's blog on the Huffington Post
 Foreign Policy Digest website
 Penn Current Student Spotlight
 White & Case bio

American activists
American columnists
Living people
People from Chevy Chase, Maryland
Princeton University alumni
University of Pennsylvania Law School alumni
Year of birth missing (living people)